Tomás Contte (born 1 August 1998) is an Argentine cyclist, who currently rides for UCI Continental team .

Major results

Road

2016
 National Junior Road Championships
1st  Time trial
2nd Road race
2019
 1st Stage 8 Doble Bragado
 1st Stage 2 Vuelta a Zamora
 3rd Road race, National Under-23 Road Championships
 9th Road race, Pan American Games

Track
2016
 2nd  Omnium, UCI Junior World Championships
2017
 Pan American Track Championships
2nd  Madison
3rd  Omnium
2018
 2nd  Madison, South American Games
2019
 1st  Pursuit, National Track Championships

References

External links

1998 births
Living people
Argentine male cyclists
Argentine track cyclists
Pan American Games competitors for Argentina
Cyclists at the 2019 Pan American Games
People from Zárate, Buenos Aires
Sportspeople from Buenos Aires Province
20th-century Argentine people
21st-century Argentine people